The hard-palate catfish (Brustiarius solidus), also known as the hard-plate catfish, is a species of sea catfish in the family Ariidae. It was described by Albert William Herre in 1935, originally under the genus Arius. It is a tropical freshwater fish which is found in Indonesia and Papua New Guinea.

The hard-palate catfish feeds on shrimp in the genus Macrobrachium, algae in the genus Salvinia, insects and nymphs, Ophieleotris aporos, leeches, earthworms, and detritus. Adults spawn year-round, laying eggs in quantities ranging from 8-85, which are incubated orally.

References

Ariidae
Taxa named by Albert William Herre
Fish described in 1935